Yeh Raha Dil is a Pakistani drama serial which aired on Hum TV on 13 February 2017, starring Ahmed Ali Akbar, Yumna Zaidi and Anum Ahmed as main leads. It is preceded by Sanam, which finished airing on 21 August 2017.Ahmed Ali Akbar and Yumna Zaidi's chemistry was highly praised by audience. It is based on the Turkish romantic comedy series İlişki Durumu: Karışık which in turn was based on South Korean series Full House . The Turkish series mentioned currently airs in Pakistan as "Mein Ayeshagul".

Plot
Hayat (Yumna Zaidi) is a young girl whose mother has died and father deserted her at a young age, who lives alone in a house and has financial issues, but even that does not dampen her spirits. Instead, she is always in a good mood and adds life to her surrounding. Zaki (Ahmed Ali), wants to be a chef and marry Nida ( Anam Goher) who is a model by profession. His father, however, is not at all in favour of this union and forbids his son to take this step. Desperate to marry Nida, Zaki leaves home and goes to Nepal where he bumps into Hayat on the plane. She too has been sent there by her friends so she can relax and write a good story which can get published to solve her monetary issues. With Zaki's mom involved in the plan, she plays the emotional card with her husband so he agrees to her son's demands. Hayat and Zaki are now in Nepal, the two meet often as Hayat faces residential and financial issues while in Nepal, running to Zaki asking for his help each time. These meets lead to a fiasco as Nida videocalls Zaki and hears Hayat in the background (who has yet again approached Zaki in his room for one of her issues) leading to misunderstandings between the two. A while later, certain events lead to Hayat telling Nida that Zaki plans to marry her instead and the two will return to Pakistan after their Nikah. This further leads to misunderstands between Nida and Zaki. Zaki, in anger, immediately leaves for Pakistan despite Hayat trying to convince him to not leave her alone. Dejected, Hayat stays for a few more days and decides to go back home once she runs out of money. On returning, while Zaki has managed to convince his parents and Nida that Hayat was just someone he had run into in Nepal and was in fact not a fling, Hayat comes back to find that her house has been sold off by her friend Salman (who sent her to Nepal in the first place) and is missing. She tries to look for him but to no avail. Hayat sneaks into the house at night and decides to stay there but an act of fate leads her to cross paths with Zaki again. it is revealed that Hayat's house was bought by Zaki's father as an investment slash ultimatum for Zaki. He wanted Zaki to convert the place into a restaurant and make it successful in 6 months to marry Nida. Zaki sympathizes with Hayat, and he discusses his feeling that it's not right to take Hayat's house away with Nida. Nida, who already dislikes Hayat, disagrees with Zaki and gets mad. As Hayat takes her luggage and walks on the streets, two robbers come and mug her. Hayat, being fed up and emotionally spent, screams at the robbers to just kill her. While she screams, the robbers steal her luggage and runoff. Zaki drives his car, looking for Hayat, and finds her crying on the street. He then takes her to his house, where he convinces his parents to let her stay until they can come up with a solution. Hayat states that she is willing to stay in the servant quarters and pay rent until she can figure out a way to repay the family for purchasing the house, to which everyone agrees.  During this time, Zaki's father takes note of Hayat's behaviour and Zaki's compassion towards her and feels that Zaki is falling in love with Hayat, who he deems to be a much better partner for his son than Nida. After that Nida's parents come to Pakistan from Dubai to plan for her wedding. Nida tells them that her father-in-law has put one condition that  until Zaki and Nida can establish restaurant business within a 6-month time period, no marriage will take place. Nida's father wanted to see the place where restaurant was going to establish. As he was back in Pakistan after 20 years, when he saw the house Hayat Manzil, he wanted more information about owners of the house from Zaki, and found that Hayat, his own daughter, was still living in the house 20 years later, until it was bought by Zaki's father. Zaki, discovering that Aafaq is Hayat's father, thinks to surprise Hayat by having the two meet in the garden, unaware of the strained relationship between the two. At the same time, Nida and her mother are standing on the rooftop, gazing over the garden, when Nida notes that her father seems quite distressed, asking her mother why. Her mother brushes off the question, responding quite maliciously and degrading her father. Nida, shocked at her mother's response, asks what was going on between her parents. Her mother states that they had decided to separate once they got Nida married. Nida is heartbroken at the news. Once Hayat and Aafaq meet, Hayat faints out of shock and is taken to the hospital. The next day Aafaq begs and insists on speaking to Hayat, to reconnect with his daughter and attempt to have a father-daughter relationship with her. Hayat begrudgingly agrees to meet with Aafaq. She confronts Aafaq in a hotel lobby, demanding to know why he abandoned her and her mother, why he displaced someone else's life for his own happiness and how he had ruined everything himself. She ends with stating that she doesn't consider Aafaq her father, nor will she ever do so, and that she never wants to see him or speak to him ever again. Hayat leaves her father in the lobby to ponder over what he has done. Hayat goes upstairs to confront Zaki (who is with Nida as well) about why he forced her into such a difficult situation, berating him over it. Zaki apologizes, but at the same time a hotel employee rushes over to tell them that Aafaq had suffered a heart attack and has been rushed to the hospital. Enraged, Nida threatens to never forgive Hayat if anything happens to her father. While at the hospital, Zaki's father rushes in to ask Zaki and Nida what happened. Zaki informs his father of the situation, while Nida interjects, stating that this was all Hayat's fault and that she should be evicted from her house. Zaki and his father both state that this isn't possible, and that they should all focus on Aafaq's health and recovery. The next morning Nida informs her mother that her father had suffered a heart attack, and both of them rush to the hospital to take care of Aafaq. Aafaq is cynical of his wife's attitude, stating that she only needs him for his money, which he assured her would still be available to them even if he died. Hayat comes to visit her father in the hospital, where they both reconcile their differences and learn to forgive one another and move on. At the same time, however, Nida is becoming more anxious at her father's reconciliation with his oldest daughter as well as Zaki's increased interest and attention towards Hayat. Afaaq and his family move in with Hayat and all of them live as a family. Zaki realises that he always cared for Nida, but never loved her and that he truly loves Hayat. He confesses it to Hayat, but Hayat refuses him thinking that she can't betray her sister. Nida senses it and becomes obsessed with Zaki and decides that she will only marry Zaki although knowing his feelings. Zaki remains oblivious to it. She pretends to be happy with Hayat. Meanwhile, Hayat gets into frequent fights with her new colleague and rival Hassan. However soon Hassan extends his hand for friendship.

Zaki tells his father about his feelings but when he gets to know that Hayat refused, he tells Zaki to marry Nida and not play with both the girls' self respect. Zaki finally tells his decision to Nida, but Nida pretends to think that Zaki is only testing her love. Zaki finally decides to marry Nida in frustration. On their engagement day, Zaki makes Hayat confess about her feelings for him personally. Zaki then plays a game and tells Hassan and Afaaq that Hayat wants to marry Hassan. Thus Hayat and Hassan's wedding also gets fixed. Hayat is shocked to know this however she plays along to save Nida and Zaki's marriage. Hayat asks Afaaq to reconcile with his wife and ask for forgiveness. Afaaq does so, but his wife disagrees as she has already made commitment to a man in London. Hayat thus plays a game with that man and finds out that the man is a cheater and he is actually cheating on Afaaq's wife. Hayat thus exposes him in front of Afaaq's wife. Thus Afaaq and his wife reconcile. Meanwhile, Nida's ex-boyfriend Tabrez returns and threatens her about exposing her pictures. Nida tells it to Hayat and Zaki and both of them support her. It is then found out that Tabrez actually has nothing. Nida is amazed by the way Zaki supports her and is ashamed of all her planning and plotting and her decision of forcing him to marry her even though Zaki already expressed his feelings. Nida finally backs off from the wedding and also tells Hassan all the truth. Hassan and Hayat's wedding also breaks off. Hayat sees Salman in the beach where he confesses that he lost everything and is guilty of what he had done. Hayat forgives him. Hayat and Zaki finally express their feelings for each other. The show ends as Hayat and Zaki travel around the world.

Cast 
 Ahmed Ali Akbar as Zaki Haroon Baig
 Yumna Zaidi as Hayat Aafaaq/Hayat Zaki Haroon
 Anam Goher as Nida
 Ayesha Sana as Fatima
 Adnan Jaffar as Jimmy
 Afraz Rasool as Tabrez
 Hammad Farooqui as Hassan
 Syeda Zahra Shah as Sidra
 Imran Peerzada as Aafaaq 
 Ehteshamuddin as Dilbar Jahangeer DJ 
 Danial Afzal Khan as Salman 
 Hira Hussain as Ragni
 Azra Mohyeddin as Zaki's mother 
 Arjumand Hussain as Haroon Baig, Zaki's father
 Mariam Mirza as Madam

Soundtrack 
The OST of 'Yeh Raha Dil' is sung by singers Atif Ali and Samra Khan. They had previously sung the song of the drama Gila together.

See also 
 2017 in Pakistani television

References

External links 
 Official Website

Pakistani drama television series
2017 Pakistani television series debuts
2017 Pakistani television series endings
Urdu-language television shows
Hum TV original programming
Serial drama television series
Romantic drama television series